The 2004 Porsche Tennis Grand Prix was a women's tennis tournament played on indoor hard courts at the Filderstadt Tennis Club in Filderstadt, Germany that was part of Tier II of the 2004 WTA Tour. It was the 27th edition of the tournament and was held from 4 October until 10 October 2004. Second-seeded Lindsay Davenport won the singles title and earned $98,500 first-prize money.

Finals

Singles

 Lindsay Davenport defeated  Amélie Mauresmo 6–2 ret.
 It was Davenport's 7th singles title of the year and the 45th of her career.

Doubles

 Cara Black /  Rennae Stubbs defeated  Anna-Lena Grönefeld /  Julia Schruff 6–3, 6–2

Prize money

References

External links
 ITF tournament edition details
 Tournament draws

Porsche Tennis Grand Prix
Porsche Tennis Grand Prix
2004 in German tennis
2000s in Baden-Württemberg
Porsch